Redvers Opie (1900–1984) was a British economist.  On the recommendation of John Maynard Keynes, he became the United Kingdom Treasury representative in Washington, D.C., as Counsellor and economic adviser at the British Embassy, 1939–46, and was one of the five members of the UK delegation to the Bretton Woods Conference, which gave birth to the International Monetary Fund and the World Bank.

Life
Opie married a daughter of the American economist F. W. Tausigg. Opie was educated at Durham University, he taught at Oxford University where he eventually became the Bursar of Magdalen College. He later went on to do a doctorate at Harvard University, where he became a member of the teaching staff.

Among many books, Opie is perhaps most famous for his translation of The Theory of Economic Development: An Inquiry into Profits, Capital, Credit, Interest, and the Business Cycle (part of the Harvard Economic Studies series) by Joseph A. Schumpeter.

He moved to Mexico, becoming a naturalized Mexican, where he founded Ecanal in 1976. Ecanal is currently a source of critical analysis of economic and government policy useful for business. Redvers died on February 10, 1984. The sole remaining partner of Ecanal is now Rogelio Ramirez de la O.

Selected bibliography

Books 
  Hardback . Translated from the 1911 original German, .

Journal articles

References

1900 births
Academics of the University of Oxford
Harvard University alumni
English emigrants to Mexico
1984 deaths
20th-century British economists
Alumni of Armstrong College, Durham